The men's omnium competition at the 2022 UEC European Track Championships was held on 15 August 2022.

Results

Qualifying
The top 8 riders in each heat qualified for the final.
Heat 1

Heat 2

Scratch race

Tempo race

Elimination race

Points race

References

Men's omnium
European Track Championships – Men's omnium